The green skink (Oligosoma chloronoton) is a species of skink native to New Zealand.

Distribution 

Green skinks can be found in the Waitaki Basin in Canterbury, as well as in Southland, Stewart Island and a few islands off Stewart Island.

Conservation status 
As of 2015 the Department of Conservation (DOC) classified the green skink as At Risk Declining under the New Zealand Threat Classification System.

References

External links 
 Holotype specimen of Oligosoma chloronoton held at the Museum of New Zealand Te Papa Tongarewa

Oligosoma
Reptiles of New Zealand
Reptiles described in 1977
Taxa named by Graham S. Hardy